Azmiye Hami Güven (1904, Konya - 1954, Ankara) was a Turkish novelist. A graduate of the Kandilli Kız Lisesi, she was one of the first Turkish woman writers of the Republican period. She is best known for Hemșire Nimet (Nimet, the Nurse) 1951.

References

1904 births
1954 deaths
Turkish novelists
Turkish women writers